Hawikuh (also spelled Hawikku, meaning "gum leaves" in Zuni), was one of the largest of the Zuni pueblos at the time of the Spanish entrada. It was founded around 1400 AD. It was the first pueblo to be visited and conquered by Spanish explorers. 

In 1960 the site was designated as a National Historic Landmark known as the Hawikuh Ruins. It is included as a contributing part of the Zuni-Cibola Complex of archaeological sites, a larger National Historic Landmark District designated by the United States Department of Interior in 1974.

History

In 1539, Estevanico was the first non-native to visit Hawikuh. Rumors and legends revolving around the disappearance of Estevanico in the region eventually led to the Tiguex War. The war occurred during a later expedition by Francisco Vásquez de Coronado, as he searched for the legendary "Seven Cities of Gold".

He wrote about the pueblo: 
Although they are not decorated with turquoises, nor made of lime or good bricks, nevertheless they are very good houses, with three, four, and five stories, where there are very good apartments ... and some very good rooms underground Kivas, paved, which are made for winter and have something like hot baths.

Some Hawikuu residents fled to the Dowa Yalanne mesa top to escape the attackers of the Coronado expedition. The 14 structures at Dowa Yalanne, which were used as a refuge from the Spaniards between 1540-1680, were called Heshoda Ayahltona ("ancient buildings above").

In 1628 the Spanish established Mission La Purísima Concepción de Hawikuh at this pueblo. The Spanish attempted to suppress the Zuni religion, and introduced the encomienda forced-labor system. In 1632, the Hawikuh Zuni rebelled, burned the church, and killed the priest. In 1672, Apache raiders burned the church. In 1680 it was burned again during the Great Pueblo Revolt, when all the Nuevo México pueblos rose against the Spanish. After this revolt, the Zuni permanently abandoned Hawikuh.

Hawikuh is located within what are now the boundaries of the Zuni Indian Reservation near Zuni, New Mexico. The ruins of Hawikuh were excavated during the period 1917-23 by the Heye Foundation under the leadership of Frederick Webb Hodge, who was assistant director of the Museum of the American Indian. The records and artifacts from this excavation are now held by the National Museum of the American Indian. It acquired Heye's museum collection in 1989. 

Hawikuh was declared a National Historic Landmark in 1961 by the Department of Interior.

See also

 List of battles fought in New Mexico
 List of National Historic Landmarks in New Mexico
 National Register of Historic Places listings in Cibola County, New Mexico

References

External links

 Hawikuh Historic Site by the National Park Service
 Hawikuh by the Center for Desert Archeology
 The Battle of Hawikuh at Cibola

Protected areas of Cibola County, New Mexico
National Historic Landmarks in New Mexico
Archaeological sites on the National Register of Historic Places in New Mexico
Ruins in the United States
Populated places established in the 13th century
Former populated places in New Mexico
History of Cibola County, New Mexico
Puebloan buildings and structures
National Register of Historic Places in Cibola County, New Mexico
Populated places on the National Register of Historic Places in New Mexico
Historic district contributing properties in New Mexico